Trollywood is the informal name for a film production facility in Trollhättan, Sweden. Movies shot there include Fucking Åmål (distributed in English-speaking countries as Show Me Love), Dancer in the Dark, Manderlay and Dogville. The movie studio Film i Väst centered there produces about half of the Swedish full-length films.

See also
Swedish Film Institute
Hollywood-inspired names
Hollywood
Bollywood
Kollywood
Nollywood
Dhallywood

Cinema of Sweden